The 2020 United States House of Representatives elections in Oklahoma were held on November 3, 2020, to elect the five U.S. representatives from the state of Oklahoma, one from each of the state's five congressional districts. The elections coincided with the 2020 U.S. presidential election, as well as other elections to the House of Representatives, elections to the United States Senate and various state and local elections.

Overview

District 1

The 1st district was located in the Tulsa metropolitan area and included Creek, Rogers, Tulsa, Wagoner and Washington counties. The incumbent Republican Kevin Hern, was elected with 59.3% of the vote in 2018. Hern won reelection with 63.7% of the vote.

Republican primary

Candidates

Nominee
 Kevin Hern, incumbent U.S. Representative

Democratic primary

Candidates

Nominee
 Kojo Asamoa-Caesar, entrepreneur

Eliminated in primary
 Mark A. Keeter, businessman

Endorsements

Primary results

Independents

Candidates

Declared
 Evelyn L. Rogers, perennial candidate

General election

Predictions

Polling

Results

District 2

The 2nd district encompassed eastern Oklahoma including Choctaw Country, Muskogee and Tahlequah. The incumbent was Republican Markwayne Mullin, who was re-elected with 65.0% of the vote in 2018. Mullin was reelected with 75% of the vote.

Republican primary

Candidates

Nominee
Markwayne Mullin, incumbent U.S. Representative

Eliminated in primary
Joseph Silk, state senator
Rhonda Hopkins,  2016 Republican candidate for District 86 of the Oklahoma House of Representatives

Endorsements

Primary results

Democratic primary

Candidates

Nominee
Danyell Lanier, project analyst

Libertarian primary

Candidates

Declared
Richie Castaldo, Libertarian nominee for Oklahoma's 2nd congressional district in 2018

General election

Predictions

Results

District 3

The 3rd district encompassed Northwestern Oklahoma, taking in the Oklahoma Panhandle, Ponca City, Pawnee, Stillwater, as well as the Osage Nation. The incumbent was Republican Frank Lucas, who was re-elected with 73.9% of the vote in 2018. Lucas was reelected with 78.5% of the vote.

Republican primary

Candidates

Nominee
Frank D. Lucas, incumbent U.S. Representative

Withdrew
Joshua Jantz

Democratic primary

Candidates

Nominee
Zoe Midyett, rancher

General election

Predictions

Results

District 4

The 4th district was located in South Central Oklahoma and took in parts of the Oklahoma City suburbs, including in Canadian County and Cleveland County. The incumbent was Republican Tom Cole, who was re-elected with 63.1% of the vote in 2018. Cole was reelected with 67.8% of the vote.

Republican primary

Candidates

Nominee
Tom Cole, incumbent U.S. Representative

Eliminated in primary
James Taylor, teacher and candidate for Oklahoma's 4th congressional district in 2016 and 2018
Trevor Sipes, businessman
Gilbert O. Sanders, mental health professional

Primary results

Democratic primary

Candidates

Nominee
Mary Brannon, retired educator and nominee for Oklahoma's 4th congressional district in 2018

Eliminated in primary
John D. Argo, metalworker
David R. Slemmons, retired librarian

Withdrew
Wyndi Brown, activist and entrepreneur
Wesley Forbes, energy program assistant

Primary results

Libertarian primary

Candidates

Declared
Bob White, Libertarian nominee for Oklahoma's 4th congressional district in 2016

General election

Predictions

Results

District 5

The 5th district was based in Oklahoma City and its surrounding suburbs. The incumbent was Democrat Kendra Horn, who flipped the district and was elected with 50.7% of the vote in 2018. Horn lost reelection to Republican challenger Stephanie Bice who received 52.1% of the vote.

Democratic primary

Candidates

Nominee
Kendra Horn, incumbent U.S. Representative

Eliminated in primary
Tom Guild, perennial candidate

Endorsements

Primary results

Republican primary

Candidates

Nominee
Stephanie Bice, Assistant Majority Floor Leader of the Oklahoma State Senate

Eliminated in runoff
Terry Neese, entrepreneur and nominee for Lieutenant Governor in 1990

Eliminated in primary
Michael Ballard, veteran
Janet Barresi, former Oklahoma Superintendent of Public Instruction
David Hill, businessman
Shelli Landon, singer
Jake A. Merrick, businessman and former Southwestern Christian University professor of philosophy and theology
Charles Tuffy Pringle, real estate broker
Miles Rahimi, U.S. Navy veteran and community organizer

Withdrew
Dan Belcher, entrepreneur
David Greene, former horse stall cleaner
Merideth VanSant, businesswoman

Declined
Kevin Calvey, Oklahoma County commissioner
Mick Cornett, former mayor of Oklahoma City and candidate for Governor of Oklahoma in 2018
Carol Hefner, Donald Trump's 2016 Oklahoma campaign manager
Bob Mills, businessman & co-chair for Donald Trump's 2016 Campaign in Oklahoma
Steve Russell, former U.S. Representative
Greg Treat, president pro tempore of the Oklahoma Senate

Endorsements

Primary results

Runoff results

General election

Predictions

Polling
Graphical summary

Polls with a sample size of <100 have their sample size entries marked in red to indicate a lack of reliability.
with Generic Republican

with Generic Opponent

with Generic Democrat and Generic Republican

Results

Notes

Partisan clients

References

External links
 
 
  (State affiliate of the U.S. League of Women Voters)
 

Official campaign websites for 1st district candidates
 Kojo Asamoa-Caesar (D) for Congress
 Kevin Hern (R) for Congress

Official campaign websites for 2nd district candidates
 Richie Castaldo (L) for Congress 
 Markwayne Mullin (R) for Congress
 Danyell Lanier (D) for Congress

Official campaign websites for 3rd district candidates
 Frank Lucas (R) for Congress
 Zoe Midyett (D) for Congress

Official campaign websites for 4th district candidates
 Mary Brannon (D) for Congress
 Tom Cole (R) for Congress

Official campaign websites for 5th district candidates
 Stephanie Bice (R) for Congress
 Kendra Horn (D) for Congress

2020
Oklahoma
United States House of Representatives